31st Street may refer to:

31st Street (Manhattan), New York City
31st Street Bridge, Pittsburgh, Pennsylvania
31st Street station, a closed rapid transit station on the Chicago 'L'